The Alexandria Aces were a baseball team based in Alexandria, Louisiana. The last version of the Aces played in the United League Baseball in 2013. The Aces have played their home games at historic Bringhurst Field, which was built in 1933 for the original Alexandria Aces.

History
That team started in 1934 as a member of the old Evangeline League and ceased operations with the league in 1942 due to World War II. This early era was highlighted by the presence of Hal Newhouser and Virgil Trucks, future Detroit Tigers' stars who headed the pitching staff of the 1939 Aces. The Aces (and the league) were revived after the war but once again ceased operations in 1957. Alexandria was the only city to field a team every year the Evangeline League operated. The Aces appeared regularly in the league's Shaughnessy playoffs and took the Evangeline pennant twice — in 1936 and 1940.

Baseball returned to Alexandria again from 1972, with the Aces as the San Diego Padres' AA farm club, and while it only lasted four years, many major league notables passed through Alexandria – in particular All-Star pitcher Randy Jones and longtime Cleveland Indians first baseman John Grubb. Duke Snider also managed the team during this period.

In the first season of the new United League in 2006, the Aces won the inaugural ULB championship before pulling off another repeat as they would win the title once again in 2007. In 2009 the Aces joined the Continental Baseball League when the ULB went bankrupt. The Aces are the 2009 CBL Champions, beating the Big Bend Cowboys 2–0. In 2010, the Aces ended their contract with the CBL, citing travel costs among other reasons before joining the college wooden bat league, the Texas Collegiate League.

On March 12, 2011 the front office announced that there would be a change to the team's logo for the first time since the team returned in 1994.

In 2013, the Aces joined United League Baseball and slightly past the halfway mark of the season, with a 24–20 record and in second place, the United League cancelled the remaining games for the Aces. Four scheduled road games were forfeited, giving the Aces an official record of 24-24. According to league CEO John Bryant, the league could not justify spending at least $100,000 for the remainder of the season because of low attendance, averaging 333 fans a game.

Team Record

All-Stars

Coaches

References

External links
 Alexandria Aces home page
 Facebook Group: The Alexandria Aces

 
Central Baseball League teams
Continental Baseball League teams
Evangeline Baseball League teams
Texas Collegiate League teams
United League Baseball teams
Amateur baseball teams in Louisiana
Professional baseball teams in Louisiana
Baseball teams established in 1994
Baseball teams disestablished in 2013
1994 establishments in Louisiana
2013 disestablishments in Louisiana
Defunct independent baseball league teams
Sports in Alexandria, Louisiana
Defunct baseball teams in Louisiana
Detroit Tigers minor league affiliates
Chicago White Sox minor league affiliates
New York Yankees minor league affiliates
San Diego Padres minor league affiliates